The Madison Square Garden Pro was a men's tennis event for professionals. It first began in 1954 and served as the opening tournament of the 1954 World Pro Tour. The event was then not staged for a further twelve years when it was re-established in 1966 as one tournament in the pro circuit. 
The 1968 and 1969 tournaments were the final events of the combined WCT/NLT tours in the Open Era of tennis, the top four players in each tour played off for the combined professional championship. From 1977 to 1989 the Masters Grand Prix ATP finals were played at Madison Square Gardens.

Singles

See also
Major professional tennis tournaments before the Open Era
Tennis Pro Tours

References

Hard court tennis tournaments
Defunct tennis tournaments in the United States
Tennis tournaments in New York City
Professional tennis tournaments before the Open Era
Madison Square Garden